John Westlake (4 February 1828 – 14 April 1913) was an English law scholar.

Biography
He was born at Lostwithiel, Cornwall, the son of a Cornish wool-stapler.  He was educated at Lostwithiel and, from 1846, at Trinity College, Cambridge, where he graduated BA (6th Wrangler and 6th Classic) in 1850. He was a fellow of Trinity from 1851 to 1860, called to the bar at Lincoln's Inn in 1854, and became a bencher of the Inn in 1874.  In 1885 he was elected to Parliament as Liberal member for the Romford Division of Essex; from 1888 to 1908 he held the Whewell Chair as professor of international law at Cambridge; in 1900-06 he was a member for Great Britain of the International Court of Arbitration at The Hague.

In 1864 he married Alice Hare (1842–1923), artist and key supporter of the women's suffrage movement.

He was connected with the Christian Socialist Movement, being a member of the Committee of Teaching and Publication. He is considered to be one of the founders of the Working Men's College in 1854, where he taught mathematics for many years. He was an honorary president of the Institute of International Law.

Works
His works, of the highest importance in their field, include:  
 ; Second edition, rewritten, 1880; fifth edition, 1912.
 
 ; ; ; .

 His Collected Papers on Public International Law were edited by L. Oppenheim in 1914.

See also
 Gustave Rolin-Jaequemyns

References

External links

 
 
  Painting(s) by or after John Westlake at the Art UK site
 

1828 births
1913 deaths
International law scholars
English legal writers
People from Lostwithiel
Liberal Party (UK) MPs for English constituencies
Members of the Institut de Droit International
Whewell Professors of International Law
UK MPs 1885–1886
Alumni of Trinity College, Cambridge
Fellows of Trinity College, Cambridge
Members of Lincoln's Inn
English Christian socialists
Members of the Permanent Court of Arbitration
English male non-fiction writers
Liberal Unionist Party MPs for English constituencies
British judges of international courts and tribunals